Wallace's tarsier, Tarsius wallacei, is  a species of Sulawesi tarsier (all tarsiers from the genus tarsius are from Sulawesi and its surrounding islands). It is found in the forests of what is referred to geologically as the neck of Sulawesi where there are two separate populations.

Taxonomy
There are two separate populations which are morphologically similar but differ in the size of the animal. The new species was named in honour of the British naturalist, Alfred Russel Wallace.

Description
It is larger than the pygmy tarsier (Tarsius pumilus). It has large eyes, a clearly defined facial-mask, white spots behind its ears and a long tail with a large bushy tail-tuft. Its fur is yellowish-brown and its throat is copper-coloured. Although morphologically similar to other species of tarsier found on Sulawesi, it has a distinctive duetting call, and genetic analysis shows that its mitochondrial and Y-chromosomal DNA sequences, and its microsatellite allele frequencies, are unique.

Distribution and habitat
Wallace's tarsier is endemic to the island of Sulawesi in Indonesia. There are two separate populations separated by Palu Bay, the capital city and the south part of the Isthmus of Palu. This tarsier is arboreal and is found in both primary and secondary forest and in degraded areas.

Status
Wallace's tarsier has a limited range, especially the southern form. The total population is unknown but is thought to be decreasing as forest is cleared to make way for plantation crops. The International Union for Conservation of Nature has rated it as "vulnerable". The northern population includes the Gunung Sojol Nature Reserve within its range. However, the southern population has such a small range that any setback to the population could have a high impact.

References

Wallace's tarsier
Endemic fauna of Indonesia
Mammals of Sulawesi
Primates of Indonesia
Wallace's tarsier